Stephen Edward Dillon (born March 20, 1943) is an American former professional baseball player. While Dillon appeared in only three major league games during his career, all in relief, he pitched in the first-ever night game played at Shea Stadium on May 6, 1964.

He was selected by the Mets in the first-year player draft after that season and spent 1963 with the Triple-A Buffalo Bisons. He made his Met debut on Thursday, September 5, in a 9–0 loss to the St. Louis Cardinals at Busch Stadium. Relieving Roger Craig in the sixth inning, he lasted 1⅔ frames and gave up three hits and two earned runs (on a triple by Tim McCarver), with one strikeout.

He made the Mets' 28-man roster out of spring training in 1964, and hurled an inning of relief on April 24 at Pittsburgh's Forbes Field before being called into the first game played under the lights at the Mets' new ballpark, Shea Stadium, on Wednesday, May 6. He was the Mets' fifth and final pitcher that evening in a 12–4 loss to the Cincinnati Reds. Dillon got the Reds out in order in the eighth inning, but in the ninth, he gave up a leadoff home run to Vada Pinson and a single to Leo Cárdenas that scored a run. Pinson's blast hit the right-center field scoreboard at the new park. When Dillon reached the dugout, legendary Mets' manager Casey Stengel told him, "Listen, if another player hits a home run off that scoreboard and breaks it, you're paying for it."  It was Dillon's last big league game; he returned to minor league baseball when the rosters were reduced to 25 men in May.

Dillon retired from baseball because of low minor league wages. His major league totals included seven hits and five earned runs allowed in 4⅔ innings pitched, with three strikeouts. Dillon became a salesman, then a New York City police officer for over twenty years. As of 2009, he was living in Baldwin, Nassau County, New York, on Long Island. Steve pitched in the Mets Old Timers game at Citi Field on August 27, 2022.

References

External links

1943 births
Living people
Auburn Mets players
Baseball players from New York (state)
Buffalo Bisons (NL) players
Fort Lauderdale Yankees players
Major League Baseball pitchers
New York Mets players
Sportspeople from Yonkers, New York
Williamsport Mets players
Cardinal Hayes High School alumni
New York City Police Department officers